Ricardo Condori (born 7 February 1950) is a Bolivian long-distance runner. He competed in the marathon at the 1972 Summer Olympics. An Aymara Indian, Condori also represented Bolivia at the 1975 Pan American Games. Condori now lives in Boardman, Ohio.

References

1950 births
Living people
Athletes (track and field) at the 1972 Summer Olympics
Bolivian male long-distance runners
Bolivian male marathon runners
Olympic athletes of Bolivia
Athletes (track and field) at the 1975 Pan American Games
Pan American Games competitors for Bolivia
Indigenous sportspeople of the Americas
Bolivian people of Aymara descent
Bolivian emigrants to the United States
Place of birth missing (living people)
People from Boardman, Ohio